KQPS (103.1 FM) is a commercial radio station that is licensed to Palm Desert, California, United States, and serves the Palm Springs—Coachella Valley radio market. The station is owned by Audacy, Inc. but is operated by Brad Fuhr (KGAY PSP) under a temporary LMA until Fuhr's full consummation from Audacy. KQPS's transmitter is off Varner Road in Cathedral City, amid other Palm Springs-area FM and TV towers.

History

Classical KCMS

The station at 103.1 FM first signed on November 27, 1977, as KCMS, playing classical music. The station was founded by broadcast engineer Paul Posen under his company, Classic Broadcasting. The original studios were located in Indio, California. Its relays were KCBI (97.3 FM), when it was affiliated with CBS Radio, and KECI (97.7 FM), broadcasting into the Imperial Valley.

In October 1983, the station changed its call sign to KEZN. By 1987, the studios were moved to a new facility in Palm Desert.

Switch to soft AC
In the early 1990s, the station switched to the nationally syndicated "Format 41" soft adult contemporary service of the Unistar Radio Network. In 1994, KEZN became the only AC station in the Palm Springs market when KPLM flipped to a country music format. Noted Los Angeles broadcaster Russ O'Hara teamed with local personality Kayla Stone for the Russ and Kayla morning drive show, as the station eliminated the Format 41 service to go with local programming.

Another local disc jockey, Debra Kaye Ahlers, occupied the midday shift, while program director Dale Berg, a noted personality from Orange County, handled afternoon drive. Later, former Nashville Network announcer Dan McGrath took over morning drive, while former KCLB personality John O (John Ostrum) assumed the afternoon slot. In 1996, Gary Bell arrived from KCBS-FM in Los Angeles. Ryan Yamanaka also served as an on-air personality from 2000 to 2001 working the overnight shift. He was also the last personality to drive KEZN's "Mr. Frosty". The early personalities helped propel KEZN to be among the top rated stations in Palm Springs.

CBS ownership
In June 1998, Posen sold his interest in the station to CBS Radio (which would later merge with Infinity Broadcasting, and would rename under the Infinity banner). Through the early 2000s, the station's format was moved from soft AC to mainstream adult contemporary. Each year from mid-November to December 25, KEZN switched to all-Christmas music. Infinity would be renamed CBS Radio in December 2005.

On December 26, 2014, after its annual Christmas format wrapped up, KEZN rebranded as "103.1 Sunny FM", with no other changes. During its Sunny FM years, the station aired the syndicated program America's Greatest Hits, hosted by Scott Shannon, on weekends.

Entercom/Audacy ownership
On February 2, 2017, CBS Radio announced it would merge with Entercom, the forerunner of Audacy. The merger was approved on November 9, 2017, and was consummated on November 17. Also in 2017, KEZN relocated to the old R&R Broadcast building in Palm Springs, located on Tahquitz Canyon Way.

On November 1, 2018, KEZN flipped to Entercom's LGBTQ-targeted talk/EDM network branded as "Channel Q", marking the first analog FM station adopting the format, which had previously been exclusive to HD Radio subchannels. The next day, KEZN changed call letters to KQPS. The station was a reporter in Billboard's Dance/Mix Show Airplay panel.

KQPS was one of three terrestrial stations of "Channel Q", a national talk/EDM network targeted to the LGBTQ community. In addition to the local Palm Springs signal, Channel Q is heard on a number of Audacy's HD Radio subchannels across the country, as well as on the Audacy internet radio platform and mobile phone application. Network hosts included Jai Rodriguez, John Duran, and Shira Lazar.

Brad Fuhr ownership
In February 2023, Audacy announced that they would sell KQPS to Brad Fuhr, owner of rival KGAY and the Gay Desert Guide website, for $600,000. Fuhr began operating KQPS via a local marketing agreement on March 6, which will last until full consummation. That same day, KQPS abandoned Channel Q programming and began simulcasting KGAY.

On March 8, 2023, at 6 a.m., KQPS flipped to a soft oldies format, branded as "103.1 MeTV FM"; the station intends to change its call sign to KMEE.

References

External links

LGBT-related radio stations
QPS
Radio stations established in 1978
1978 establishments in California
Audacy, Inc. radio stations